is a Japanese tokusatsu superhero television series. It is the seventh installment in the Kamen Rider Series. The series was broadcast on the Mainichi Broadcasting System from October 17, 1980, to October 3, 1981. The series was a co-production between Toei and Ishinomori Productions, and was created by Shōtarō Ishinomori.

Story
Kazuya Oki volunteers to undergo cybernetic surgery in the International Space Development Program in the United States to become an astronaut who can survive in outer space without the need for a bulky external suit. After a successful operation, he is given the codename "Super-1". Before he can depart for space, however, the base where he received his operation is attacked by the Dogma Kingdom. Only Kazuya can escape and is determined to avenge the deaths of the scientists, he returns to Japan and is trained by a martial arts expert, Master Genkai. With this knowledge, he can transform into the powerful Kamen Rider Super-1 to fight the evil Dogma Kingdom and later Jin Dogma.

Cast and characters
Shunsuke Takasugi as 
Nobuo Tsukamoto as 
Teru Satō (Played as ) as 
Yumiko Tanaka as 
Katsuya Hayakawa as 
Munemaru Kōda as : Kazuya's master and practitioner of the Sekishin Shaolin Fist martial arts.
Kenji Nishiyama as 
Rieko Nagatsuka as 
Kazunori Tanaka as 
Tadaomi Watanabe as 
Ayumu Iwaki as 
Moriyuki Ogidō as 
Izumi Nakamura as 
Hitoshi Hagiwara as 
Ulf Ōtsuki as 
Shinji Nakae as The Narrator

Dogma Kingdom
The  is a secret extremist organization originating from Dark-Nebula B-26 who are seeking to kill Super-1 and rule the earth with their cyborgs, purging all those deemed unworthy of the utopia.
Akira Shioji as : The leader of the Dogma Kingdom, an ancient-looking man who surrounds himself with bodyguards. The bells that hang down under his throne ring to announce his arrival, and also serve as a means of discipline. After General Megirl's failure to destroy Super-1, he transforms into Kaiser Crow to fight him personally and is destroyed by Super-1's Super Rider Moon Surface Kick.
Toshihiko Miki as : The Dogma Kingdom's only eminent chief, he was a human named  until an event five years prior resulted in his joining Dogma. He rides the horse  and is a master of the sword. After all of his subordinates are killed, he transforms into Death Buffalo to fight Kamen Rider Super-1 and is destroyed by Super-1's Super Rider Spark Kick.
 : As their name states, they won't let anyone get too close to Terror Macro. They are higher ranks than General Megirl.
 : The Dogma Kingdom's foot soldiers. Scientists wear white gowns.

Jin Dogma
After the destruction of the Dogma Kingdom, the  organization appeared to take its place in terrorizing Japan.
Kentarō Kachi as : The leader of the Jin Dogma, a coldhearted cyborg fighter who praises the glory of cybernetics. After his servants were killed by Kamen Rider Super-1, he transformed into Satan Snake to fight Kamen Rider Super-1.
Yuki Yoshizawa as : Wearing a butterfly mask, she has no interest in Jin Dogma's affairs. She was destroyed by Super-1's Super Rider Horizon Kick.
Hiroo Kawarazaki as : A quick-tempered character. He was destroyed by Super-1's Super Rider Horizon Kick.
Kazuo Suzuki as : An unusual figure. He was destroyed by Super Rider's Sky Continual Kick.
Yōko Tōdō as : A voluptuous sorceress. Assuming the form of Majoringa, she was destroyed fighting Super-1 with the Lightning Sword while praising Jin Dogma with her last breath.
 : The Jin Dogma's foot soldiers who brainwashed and upgraded the Dogma Fighters of the Dogma Kingdom. Footsoldiers have a silver mask and silver lines, and bodyguards have a golden mask and golden lines.

List of episodes

Kamen Rider Super-1: The Movie
The film was released on March 14, 1981, and was produced by Tōru Hirayama.

Plot
The Dogma Kingdom attacks the Matagi (mountain tribe) village of Yamabiko to steal the sacred Flying Dragon Fortress and wreak havoc all over Japan. Six children from the fallen village take refuge in a nearby town, keeping their identities as Matagi citizens a secret. Kamen Rider Super-1 must protect these kids from the Dogma Kingdom, as they hold the secret to the Flying Dragon Fortress' weakness.

Cast
Shunsuke Takasugi as Kamen Rider Super-1
Nobuo Tsukamoto as Jiro Tanihara
Hiroshi Miyauchi as Shiro Kazami / Kamen Rider V3 (Voice)

Songs
Opening theme

Lyrics: Shotaro Ishinomori
Composition: Shunsuke Kikuchi
Artist: Shunsuke Takasugi with Kōrogi '73

Ending themes

Lyrics: Saburō Yatsude
Composition: Shunsuke Kikuchi
Artist: Shunsuke Takasugi with Korōgi '73
Episodes: 1-23

Lyrics: Kei Akai
Composition: Shunsuke Kikuchi
Artist: Ichirou Mizuki with the Columbia Yurikago-kai and Kōrogi '73
Episodes: 24-48

International broadcasts
Super-1 aired in Indonesia in 1995 via RCTI. In this version, the opening and ending songs were changed into two other ones (not a dubbed soundtrack). First, Super One for the opening theme and Kuserahkan for the ending song.

External links

Super-1
1980 Japanese television series debuts
1981 Japanese television series endings
Mainichi Broadcasting System original programming
1980s Japanese television series